Michel Joseph Gilles Labadie (August 17, 1932 – April 17, 1990) was a professional ice hockey player who played three games in the National Hockey League.  He played with the New York Rangers.

References

External links

1932 births
1990 deaths
Canadian ice hockey right wingers
Ice hockey people from Quebec
New York Rangers players
People from Gaspésie–Îles-de-la-Madeleine